The 2014–15 season was Hartlepool United's 106th season in existence and the second consecutive season in Football League Two. Along with competing in League Two, the club also participated in the FA Cup, League Cup and League Trophy. The season covers the period from 1 July 2014 to 30 June 2015.

Players

First team squad

Competitions

Pre-season matches

League Two

League table

Results by matchday

Matches

FA Cup

League Cup

Football League Trophy

Transfers

Transfers in

Transfers out

Loans in

Loans out

Squad statistics

Appearances and goals

|}

References

2014–15
Hartlepool United
2010s in County Durham